VAIO is a brand of personal computers and consumer electronics, currently developed by Japanese manufacturer , headquartered in Azumino, Nagano Prefecture.

VAIO was originally a brand of Sony, introduced in 1996. In February 2014, Sony created VAIO Corporation Inc., a special purpose company with investment firm Japan Industrial Partners, as part of its restructuring effort to focus on mobile devices. Sony maintains a minority stake in the new, independent company, which currently sells computers in the United States, Japan, India, and Brazil, and maintains exclusive marketing agreements in other regions. Sony still holds the intellectual property rights for the VAIO brand and logo.

Etymology
Originally an acronym of Video Audio Integrated Operation, this was amended to Visual Audio Intelligent Organizer in 2008 to celebrate the brand's 10th anniversary. The logo, along with the first of the VAIO computers, were designed by Teiyu Goto, supervisor of product design from the Sony Creative Center in Tokyo. He incorporated many meanings into the logo and acronym: the pronunciation in both English (VAIO) and Japanese is similar to "bio", which is symbolic of life and the product's future evolution; it's also near "violet", which is why most early Vaios were purple or included purple components. Additionally, the logo is stylized to make the "VA" look like a sine wave and the "IO" like binary digits 1 and 0, the combination representing the merging of analog and digital signals. The sound some Vaio models make when starting up is derived from the melody created when pressing a telephone keypad to spell the letters V-A-I-O.

History

As part of Sony 
Although Sony made computers in the 1980s, such as MSX-based HitBit computers mainly for the Japanese market, the company withdrew from the computer business around the beginning of the 1990s. Under the then-new VAIO brand, Sony's re-entry into the global computer market began in 1996. Sony's then-president Nobuyuki Idei thought "there was no point making an ordinary PC", so the VAIO lineup was to focus on Audio Visual (as the VAIO name suggests), portability, and design.

The PCV-90 was the first series of desktops introduced in 1996, and designed with a 3D graphical interface as a novelty for new users. The first VAIO laptop computers followed in 1997 with the US$2,000 PCG-505 "SuperSlim" model, constructed out of a four-panel magnesium body. VisualFlow was a Sony program distributed in the late 1990s and early 2000s with Sony VAIO computers.

Over the years, many audio visual technologies and interfaces pioneered by Sony became a key focus for its VAIO computers, including Memory Stick, i.Link, and even MiniDisc.

In 2001, Steve Jobs presented a Vaio PC running MacOS to Sony executives, suggesting the possibility of collaboration. Sony's Vaio team ultimately turned down the proposal they regarded a "diversion of resources", as the popularity of the Windows-based premium PC brand was growing.

Sony Vaio's later designs were released during a period of low PC sales and included models with innovations such as magnetized stands and the Vaio Tap, which was designed with a completely separate keyboard. The latest models were complemented by the Windows 10 operating system.

Spin-off from Sony
On 4 February 2014, Sony announced that it would sell its Vaio PC business due to poor sales. In March 2014, it was announced that Japan Industrial Partners had purchased a 95% stake in the VAIO division.

The sale was closed on 1 July 2014; on the same day, the company announced refreshed entries in the VAIO Fit and Pro lines. The re-launched products initially distributed in Japan, then later in Brazil. In August 2015, Vaio announced plans to re-enter international markets, beginning with Brazil and the United States. Vaio CEO Yoshimi Ota stated that the company planned to focus more on high-end products in niche segments (such as the creative industries), as they felt Sony was somewhat too focused on attempting to garner a large market share in its PC business. The Canvas Z tablet was released in the United States on 5 October 2015, through Microsoft Store and the Vaio website. On 16 October 2015, Vaio agreed to introduce their products in Brazil through a partnership with a local manufacturer Positivo Informática.

On 2 February 2016, Vaio announced that it would unveil a Windows 10 smartphone. Also that month, it was also reported that Vaio was negotiating with Toshiba and Fujitsu Technology Solutions to consolidate their personal computer businesses together.

On 4 June 2018, Nexstgo Company Limited announced that they will be licensed by VAIO Corporation to oversee the business in Asia. This license agreement between Hong Kongbased Nexstgo and the Japan-based VAIO Corporation will include manufacturing, sales and marketing as well as servicing of VAIO laptops under the VAIO trademark in the Hong Kong, Macau, Malaysia, Singapore and Taiwan markets.

Currently in the US, VAIO business products are sold by Trans Cosmos America, Inc.

Products

Sony VAIO (1996 to 2014)

Sony's VAIO brand included product lines across notebooks, subnotebooks, desktops, media centres, and even Network media solutions.

Computers

Sony's VAIO range of computers consisted of the following lineups:

Desktops
 Desktops
 PCV series (19962005)
 Multimedia Desktops
 M series (19981999)
 MX series (2000, built-in FM radio, MiniDisc player and amplifier)
 Tablet PC Desktops
 LX series (20002008)
 Media Center PCs
 VGX-XL series (2005, audio receiver form factor)
 VGX-TP series (2007, cylindrical disc form factor)
 VGC-R series (2006)
 All-In-One Computers
 VGC series
 W series (20022006)
 VA series (20052006, 20", integrated TV tuner)
 L series (20062013, 15.4" or 19" touchscreen display, integrated TV tuner, Sony's Living Room PC)
 Vaio Tap 20 (2013, 20" touchscreen display)
 Vaio Tap 21 (2014, 21.5" 1920 x 1080 touchscreen display)

Notebooks
 Ultraportable Premium
 505 series (19972004, 10.4" or 12.1" display, external floppy and CD drives, originally called SuperSlim)
 700 series (19971998, 12.1" display, external floppy and CD drives)
 800 series (19981999, 13.3" display, external floppy and CD drives)
 TX series (20052007, 11.1" 1366 x 768 display, first laptop with 16:9 LED backlit display)
 TZ series (20072008, 11.1" 1366 x 768 display)
 TT series (20082010, 11.1" 1366 x 768 display)
 SZ series (20062008, 13.3" 1280 x 800 display, switchable graphics)
 Z series (20082014, 13.1" display, switchable graphics)
 Ultraportable Mainstream
 SR series (2001, 10.4” SVGA display, circular trackpad)
 SRX series (2001, 10.4” 1024 x 768 display, circular trackpad)
 TR series (2003, 10.6" 1280 x 768 display)
 VX series (2002, 10.4" or 12.1" display)
 SR series (20082010, 13.3" 1280 x 800 display)
 S series (20102013, 13.3" 1600 x 900 display)
 T series (20122014, 13.3" 1366 x 768 display)
 Y series (13.3" 1366 x 768 display, no optical drive)
 Ultraportable Netbooks
 G series (2007, 12.1" 1024 x 768 display, Intel Core processor)
 M series (2008, 10.1" 1024 x 600 display, Intel Atom processor)
 W series (2009, 10.1" 1366 x 768 display, Intel Atom processor)
 X series (11.1" 1366 x 768 display, Intel Atom processor)
 Consumer, Home & Work
 F series (19992000, 13.0" or 14.1" 1024 x 768 display, desktop replacement)
 FX/FXA series (20012003, 14.1" display, desktop replacement) 
 XG/XE/XR series (19992001, 13.3" or 14.1" 1024 x 768 display, modular DVD/CD-RW/Floppy/2nd battery/2nd hard drive bay)
 QR series (2001, 13.3” 1024 x 768 display)
 FRV series (2003, 15" 1024 x 768 display, desktop replacement)
 GR series (2002, 15” 1400 x 1050 display, desktop replacement, swappable multi-bay)
 GRX series (2002, 15” 1024 x 768 or 16.1" 1600 x 1200 display, desktop replacement)
 GRZ series (2003, 15” 1024 x 768 display, desktop replacement)
 GRT series (2004, 15" 1024 x 768 or 16.1" 1600 x 1200 display, desktop replacement)
 NV/NVR series (2002-2005, 15" 1024 x 768 or 1440 x 1050 display, modular Floppy/MiniDisc/Numeric Keypad/Compact Subwoofer bay)
 Z1 series (2004, 14.1” 1400 x 1050 display)
 B series (2004)
 BX series (2005, 14.1" display)
 FJ series (2005, 14.1" display)
 C series (13.3" 1280 x 800 display, choice of colors)
 CR series (2007, 14.1" 1280 x 800 display, choice of colors)
 NR series (2007, 15" 1280 x 800 display)
 E series (2010, 15.5" or 17.3" display, choice of colors)
 XE series (2011, 15.5" 1920 x 1080 display)
 Vaio Fit 14 & 15 (2013, 14" or 15" touchscreen laptop, SVF)
 Vaio Duo (2013, 13.3" hybrid touchscreen laptop, SVD)
 Vaio Tap 11 (2013, 11.6" touchscreen convertible, SVT)
 Multimedia
 A series (2004, 17" 1920 x 1200 display)
 AX series (2005, 17" 1440 x 900 display)
 AR series (2006, 17" 1440 x 900 or 1920 x 1200 display, first with BD-R drive)
 AW series (2008, 18.4" 1680 x 945 or 1920 x 1200 display)
 Portable Entertainment
 FS series (20052006, 15.4" 1280 x 800 display)
 FE series (20062007, 15.4" 1280 x 800 display)
 FZ series (20072008, 15.4" 1280 x 800 display)
 FW series (20082010, 16.4" 1920 x 1080 display)
 F series (2010, 16.4" 1920 x 1080 display)
 NW series (2009, 15.4" 1366 x 768 display)
 Lifestyle & UMPC Subnotebooks
 C1 series (19982003, 8.9" 1024 x 480 display, branded as PictureBook)
 GT series (2001, Japan only, 6.4" display, built-in digital camera)
 U series (20022004, 6.4" or 7.1" 1024 x 768 display)
 UX series (2006, 4.5" 1024 x 600 display, Sony's first UMPC)
 P series (20092010, 8" 1600 x 768 display)

Experience

Included as part of the out-of-box experience are prompts to register at Club Vaio, an online community for Vaio owners and enthusiasts, which also provides automatic driver updates and technical support via email, along with exclusive desktop wallpapers and promotional offers. From 1997 to 2001 in Japan, the SAPARi program was also pre-installed on Vaio machines.  On later models, the customer is also prompted to register the installed trial versions of Microsoft Office 2010 and the antivirus software (Norton AntiVirus on older models, and McAfee VirusScan or TrendMicro on newer ones) upon initial boot.

Vaio computers come with components from companies such as Intel processors, Seagate Technology, Hitachi, Fujitsu or Toshiba hard drives, Infineon or Elpida RAM, Atheros and Intel wireless chipsets, Sony (usually made by Hitachi) or Matsushita optical drives, Intel, NVIDIA or AMD graphics cards and Sony speakers. Recent laptops have been shipped with Qimonda RAM, HP speakers with Realtek High Definition Audio Systems, and optional Dolby Sound Room technology.

A selection of media centres were added to the Vaio range in 2006. These monitorless units (identified by a product code prefixed by VGX rather than VGN) are designed to form part of a home entertainment system. They typically take input from a TV tuner card, and output video via HDMI or composite video connection to an ideally high-definition television. The range included the XL and TP lines. The VGX-TP line is visually unique, featuring a circular, 'biscuit-tin' style design with most features obscured behind panels, rather than the traditional set-top box design.

In 2013, Sony Vaio's range comprised seven products. The most basic were the E, T and S series while the high end models, the F and Z Series, were discontinued. Sony also had a range of hybrid tablet computers, with models called Vaio Duo 11/13, Vaio Tap 11/20 and Vaio Fit multi-flip, as well as a desktop computer under the L series. These models use Windows systems and Intel processors, as described above.

Portable music players
Sony released some of their early digital audio players (DAP) under the Vaio line. The first model, the "VAIO Music Clip", was released in 1999, powered by an AA battery and featuring 64 MB of internal memory. It differed from Sony's players in the "Network Walkman" line which used external Memory Stick medium instead at the time. Succeeding models were also released, but it was mainly sold domestically, with Walkman-branded players more widespread internationally. In 2004 the brand made a comeback with the VAIO Pocket (model VGF-AP1L), featuring a 40 GB hard disk drive for up to 26,000 songs, and a 2.0-inch color LCD display. Like Walkman DAPs it used SonicStage software.

Music streamers
Sony had also released several other products under the VAIO lineup, including the VAIO WA1 wireless digital music streamer, essentially a portable radio and speaker.

VAIO (2014 to present)

The current lineup of Vaio computers, developed by VAIO Corporation, continues the same product line naming, and currently include:
 Vaio Z
 Vaio SX14
 Vaio SX12
 Vaio FH14

Z Canvas

The first new VAIO computer developed by VAIO corporation was the Vaio Z Canvas 2-in-1 PC, which began sales on 23 September 2015 starting from $2,199 in the USA. The Z Canvas is focused on creative professionals as its target audience. Graphic artists, illustrators, animators, etc. With a 12.3-inch LCD WQXGA+ 2560 x 1704 IPS multi-touch display with digitizer stylus (pen) capability, the Z Canvas looks similar in design to the Microsoft Surface Pro 3, but comes with Windows 10 Pro and is available as a Microsoft Signature PC. It has an Intel Core i7 processor, an Intel Iris Pro Graphics 5200, a 2nd generation PCIe SSD with PCIe Gen.3 compatibility (up to 1 TB) or SATA/M.2 for the 256 GB model, and up to 16 GB of memory.

Smartphones
In February 2016, Vaio announced the Vaio Phone Biz which is a premium built mid-range Windows 10 Mobile device. This is Vaio's first Windows smartphone. In March 2017, Vaio announced Vaio Phone A, which has the look of the Vaio Phone Biz, but uses the Android operating system instead.

Technology

Innovations

Over the years, the Sony VAIO lineup has been responsible for many 'firsts' in desktops and laptops, as well as for setting trends for what would now be considered standard equipment.

Integrated webcam

The Sony VAIO C1 PictureBook subnotebook, first released in 1998, was among the first to feature a built in web-cam, at 0.27 megapixels, and could swivel around to capture photos on both sides.

Chiclet keyboards

The Sony VAIO X505 laptop, released in 2004, popularized the chiclet keyboard in laptops.

Displays

Some Sony Vaio models come with Sony's proprietary XBRITE (known as ClearBright in Japan and the Asia-Pacific region) displays. The first model to introduce this feature was the Vaio TR series, which was also the first consumer product to utilize such technology. It is a combination of smooth screen, anti-reflection (AR) coating and high-efficiency lens sheet. Sony claims that the smooth finish provides a sharper screen display, the AR coating prevents external light from scattering when it hits the screen, and the high-efficiency lens sheet provides 1.5 times the brightness improvement over traditional LCD designs. Battery life is also extended through reduced usage of the LCD backlight. The technology was pioneered by Sony engineer Masaaki Nakagawa, who is in charge of the Vaio TR development.

The TX series, introduced in September 2005, was the first notebook to implement a LED back-lit screen, which provides lower power consumption and greater color reproduction. This technology has since been widely adopted by many other notebook manufacturers. The TX series was also the first to use a 16:9 aspect ratio screen with 1366x768 resolution. The successor to the TX series was the TZ series in May 2007. This new design featured an optional 32 or 64GB Solid State Drive (SSD) for rapid boot-up times, quicker application launches and greater durability. If selected, a 250 GB Hard Drive could also have been included in place of the built-in CD/DVD drive to provide room for additional storage. For security, this model included a biometric fingerprint sensor and Trusted Platform Module. The TZ offered a built-in highly miniaturized Motion Eye camera built into the LCD panel for video conferencing. Additional features included the XBRITE LCD, integrated Wireless Wide Area Network (WWAN) technology and Bluetooth technology.

Switchable graphics

The SZ series was the first to use switchable graphics – the motherboard contained an Intel GMCH (Graphics Memory Controller Hub) featuring its own in-built graphics controller (complete memory hub controller and graphics accelerator on the one die) and a separate NVIDIA graphics accelerator chipset directly interfaced with the GMCH. The GMCH could be used to reduce power consumption and extend battery life whereas the NVIDIA chipset would be used when greater graphics processing power was needed. A switch is used to toggle between the graphics options but required the user to preselect the mode to be used before the motherboard could initialize. The Z series, which replaced the SZ series, can change graphics modes "on the fly" on Windows Vista, and does not require a restart of the system. This feature has subsequently been used by other manufacturers, including Apple, Asus and Alienware.

Blu-ray

The AR Series was the first to incorporate a Blu-ray Disc burner, at the height of the Blu-Ray vs. HD-DVD format war. This series was designed to be the epitome of high-definition products including a 1080p capable WUXGA (1920 × 1200 pixels) screen, HDMI output and the aforementioned Blu-ray burner. The AR series also includes an illuminated logo below the screen. Blu-ray/HDMI capable models have been the subject of intense promotion since mid-2007, selling with a variety of bundled Blu-ray Discs. The AR series was subsequently replaced by the AW series, and in 2011, replaced by the F Series, which incorporates all of these features in a 16.4" 16:9 display.

Startup Chime
The chime heard when a VAIO computer is booted are the DTMF notes corresponding to V-A-I-O (8-2-4-6) dialed on a telephone keypad.

Bundled Software
Sony has been criticized for loading its Vaio laptops with bloatware, or ineffective and unrequested software that supposedly allows the user to immediately use the laptop for multimedia purposes. This includes trial versions of Adobe Premiere Elements & Adobe Photoshop Elements with Vaio Media Gate and XMB. Sony later offered a "Fresh start" option in some regions with several of their business models. With this option, the computer is shipped only with a basic Windows operating system and very little trial software already installed.

The default webcam software in Vaio notebooks is ArcSoft WebCam Companion. It offers a set of special effects called Magic-i visual effects, through which users can enhance the images and videos taken through the webcam. It also features a face detection feature. Certain other Sony proprietary software such as Click to Disc Editor, Vaio Music Box, Vaio Movie Story, Vaio Media Plus are also included with recent models. Those shipped with ATI Radeon Video cards  feature the Catalyst Control Centre, which enables control of brightness, contrast, resolution etc., and also enables connection to an external display the best laptop.

Recovery Media
Early Sony VAIO models included recovery media in the form of CDs and/or DVDs.

Beginning in mid-2005, a hidden partition on the hard drive, accessible at boot via the BIOS or within Windows via a utility was used instead. Pressing [F10] at the Vaio logo during boot-up will cause the notebook to boot from the recovery partition; where the user has the choice of either running hardware diagnostics without affecting the installed system, or restoring (re-imaging) the hard drive to factory condition – an option that destroys all user installed applications and data). The first time a new VAIO PC is started up, users are prompted to create their own recovery media. This physical media would be required in case of hard disk failure and/or replacement. In cases where the system comes with Windows 7 64-bit pre-installed, the provided recovery media restores the system to Windows 7 32- or 64-bit.

Explanatory notes

See also
 Sony NEWS
 Splashtop covers Vaio Quick Web Access

References

External links

 Official Website (Japan)
 Official Website (United States)
 Sony US VAIO Product Support
 Sony VAIO UK
 Sony VAIO India
 Official Website (Hong Kong)
 Official Website (Taiwan)
 Official Website (Singapore)
 Official Website (Malaysia)

 
Sony products
Consumer electronics brands
Computer-related introductions in 1996
Electronics companies established in 2014
Computer companies established in 2014
Japanese companies established in 2014
Companies based in Nagano Prefecture
Corporate spin-offs
Japanese brands